The 1930 VFL Grand Final was an Australian rules football game contested between the Collingwood Football Club and Geelong Football Club, held at the Melbourne Cricket Ground in Melbourne on 11 October 1930. It was the 32nd annual Grand Final of the Victorian Football League, staged to determine the premiers for the 1930 VFL season. The match, attended by 45,022 spectators, was won by Collingwood by a margin of 30 points, marking that club's ninth premiership victory and fourth in succession. As of 2022, Collingwood is the only team in VFL/AFL history to win 4 consecutive premiersips.

Background 
The Great Depression had taken hold by the 1930 VFL season, and, for many, sport was a rare diversion from dire circumstances. While Don Bradman and Phar Lap enthralled the cricket and racing worlds, respectively, the residents of Collingwood, many of whom were made virtually destitute, were inspired by the Collingwood Football Club, who had won the previous three flags.

The Magpies finished on top of the ladder with 15 wins and 3 losses. Carlton was highly fancied to finish on top after winning 13 of their first 14 home-and-away games, but in losing 2 of their last 4 games, they finished second. Richmond, Geelong and Melbourne filled the next 3 spots, all on 11 wins.

Geelong beat a woefully inaccurate Carlton in the First Semi-Final, while in the Second Semi-Final Collingwood beat their old rival in Richmond in a thriller by 3 points.

Collingwood met Geelong in the Final, and, as minor premiers, they had a right to another game if defeated. They were required to exercise this right after Geelong won by 26 points.

Match summary 

Collingwood's famous coach, Jock McHale, could not attend the 1930 Grand Final, being confined to bed with the flu. Veteran administrator, club treasurer and former premiership player Bob Rush took charge in his place. Nevertheless, following a decision by AFL historians in 2014, McHale is now credited as Collingwood's sole coach in the game for the purposes of coaching statistics.

The Magpies started the match aggressively, and seemed too intent on playing the man. The Cats, however, focused on the ball and kicked the goals. Their pace and work in the air saw them leading by 21 points at half time.

At half time, Rush delivered what Harry Collier recalled was one of the most inspirational speeches that he had ever heard, and the team produced one of the most dominant and important quarters in the club's history, coming from a 27-point deficit to lead by 32 at 3-quarter time. Goals came from Gordon Coventry, Makeham, H Collier and Beveridge. Geelong had become "listless and ragged whereas Collingwood were tearing along in their best style". The Sun described the club's third term as "one of the finest ever seen in football… it was an object lesson to every team in rising to the occasion after being apparently beaten, and by sheer grit and magnificent teamwork, sweeping down every obstacle in their way of finals success."

Both teams kicked 3 goals in the final quarter, but Collingwood won by 30 points.

In winning four successive premierships from 1927 to 1930, Collingwood set a record that has not been equalled to date. The teams from this era became known as "The Machine" for the teamwork, efficiency and effectiveness with which they played.

Match statistics

Teams

See also
 1930 VFL season

References 

1930 VFL Grand Final statistics
 The Official statistical history of the AFL 2004
 Ross, J. (ed), 100 Years of Australian Football 1897–1996: The Complete Story of the AFL, All the Big Stories, All the Great Pictures, All the Champions, Every AFL Season Reported, Viking, (Ringwood), 1996. 
 Atkinson, Graeme: The Complete Book of AFL Finals, 1996. 
 McFarlane, Glenn and Roberts, Michael: The Machine – The Inside Story of  Football's Greatest Team, 2005. 
 Lovett, Michael: AFL Record: Guide to Season 2007, AFL Publishing, 2007. 

VFL/AFL Grand Finals
Grand
Collingwood Football Club
Geelong Football Club
October 1930 sports events